Windham School District (SAU 95) is a public school district located in Windham, New Hampshire, United States. The district contains two elementary schools, one middle school, and one high school. During the 2016–17 school year, 2940 students were enrolled within the district's schools. A $38.9 million school renovation project of the district's Golden Brook School and Windham Middle School was completed in 2019.

Schools

High schools
Windham High School

Middle schools
Windham Middle School
Windham Woods School

Elementary schools
Windham Center School, grades 5-6
Golden Brook School, grades PreK-4

References

External links

School districts in New Hampshire
Education in Rockingham County, New Hampshire